Moses Cohen Henriques was a Dutch pirate of Portuguese Sephardic Jewish origin, operating in the Caribbean.

Henriques helped Dutch naval officer and folk hero Admiral Piet Pieterszoon Hein, of the Dutch West India Company, capture the Spanish treasure fleet in the battle of the Bay of Matanzas in Cuba, during the Eighty Years' War, in 1628.

Part of the Spanish fleet in Venezuela had been warned because a Dutch cabin boy had lost his way on Blanquilla Island and was captured, betraying the plan, but the other half from Mexico continued its voyage, unaware of the threat. Sixteen Spanish ships were intercepted; one galleon was taken after a surprise encounter during the night, nine smaller merchants were talked into a surrender; two small ships were taken at sea fleeing, four fleeing galleons were trapped on the Cuban coast in the Bay of Matanzas. After some musket volleys from Dutch sloops their crews surrendered also and the Dutch captured 11,509,524 Dutch guilders of booty in gold, silver, and other expensive trade goods, such as indigo and cochineal, without any bloodshed. The Dutch did not take prisoners: they gave the Spanish crews ample supplies for a march to Havana.

Henriques then went on to lead a Jewish contingent in Brazil during the Dutch rule, and established his own pirate island off the Brazilian coast. After the Portuguese Empire's recapture of Northern Brazil in 1654, Moses fled South America and ended up as an advisor to Henry Morgan, the leading pirate of the time. Even though his role as a pirate was disclosed during the Spanish Inquisition, he was never caught.

References

 Ahoy, mateys! Thar be Jewish pirates! by Adam Wills at Jewish Journal, Sep 15, 2006
 Moses Cohen Henriques Biography at J-Grit: The Internet Index of Tough Jews
  Jewish pirates of the Caribbean by Gil Zohar at The Jerusalem Post, April 9, 2016
 The Forgotten Jewish Pirates of Jamaica by Ross Kenneth Urken at smithsonian.com, July 7, 2016
 Jewish Pirates of the Caribbean, by Edward Kritzler

Year of birth missing
Year of death missing
17th-century Dutch people
17th-century Jews
17th-century pirates
Caribbean Jews
Dutch Sephardi Jews
Dutch people of Portuguese-Jewish descent
Portuguese pirates
Dutch pirates
Dutch people of the Eighty Years' War (United Provinces)
People of Dutch Brazil

Dutch people of Portuguese descent